is a Japanese footballer manager.

Career statistics

Club

Notes

Managerial statistics

References

External links

Bin Ukishima at Eurosport

1967 births
Living people
Sportspeople from Tokyo Metropolis
Association football people from Tokyo Metropolis
Japanese footballers
Japan Soccer League players
Japan Football League (1992–1998) players
Yokohama F. Marinos players
Kawasaki Frontale players
Japanese football managers
J1 League managers
Shonan Bellmare managers
Association footballers not categorized by position